Peter James Stange (born February 28, 1931) is an American water polo player who competed in the 1952 Summer Olympics. He was born in Santa Monica, California.  Stange was a water polo player while a student at the University of California, Los Angeles. Stange was a member of the American water polo team which finished fourth in the 1952 tournament. He played three matches.

External links
profile

1931 births
Living people
UCLA Bruins men's water polo players
American male water polo players
Olympic water polo players of the United States
Water polo players at the 1952 Summer Olympics